BIPP  may refer to:
British Institute of Professional Photography
Barisan Islam Pembebasan Patani
"Bipp", a song by Sophie